Acidosasa edulis is a species of bamboo native to China. It is cultivated for its edible shoots in the provinces of Fujian, Zhejiang and Jiangxi, with yields of up to 20,000 kilograms per hectare.

References

Bambusoideae